Margo Todd (born July 24, 1950) is an American historian.

Education 
Todd obtained an undergraduate degree from Tufts University and attended the Washington University in St. Louis, where she earned a master's degree and doctorate.

Career 
Todd joined the Vanderbilt University faculty. In 2003, Todd began teaching at the University of Pennsylvania as the Walter H. Annenberg Professor of History. Todd was awarded a Guggenheim fellowship in 2004.

References

1950 births
Living people
Tufts University alumni
Washington University in St. Louis alumni
University of Pennsylvania faculty
University of Pennsylvania historian
American women historians
20th-century American historians
21st-century American historians
Writers from Peoria, Illinois
20th-century American women writers
21st-century American women writers
Vanderbilt University faculty
Historians of the United Kingdom
American historians of religion
Historians from Illinois